Finn Hansen (born 4 March 1955) is a Danish equestrian. He competed in the individual dressage event at the 1996 Summer Olympics.

References

1955 births
Living people
Danish male equestrians
Danish dressage riders
Olympic equestrians of Denmark
Equestrians at the 1996 Summer Olympics
Place of birth missing (living people)